Victor Gonçalves Amaro (born 31 January 1987) is a Brazilian retired footballer.

References

Amaro signed for Nongbua Pitchaya in 2017.

External links
Victor Amaro profile at Thai Premier League Official Website

Victor Amaro profile at Goal

1987 births
Living people
Association football midfielders
Brazilian expatriate footballers
Brazilian expatriate sportspeople in Thailand
Brazilian footballers
Expatriate footballers in Thailand
Victor Amaro
Madureira Esporte Clube players
Victor Amaro
Victor Amaro